Namak Haraam is a daily soap that premiered at the Indian channel Real TV on 2 March 2009. Swati is an idealistic district collector, who is married to Karan, a business tycoon. Everything seems to be fine among them until their individual ideals start affecting their personal life.
Swati is keen to start a housing project for the villagers on a plot of land that Karan's father, Indrajeet Sehgal (Shishir Sharma), is eyeing to build a cement factory. He encourages Karan to use the power Swati wields as a bureaucrat to make profit in business. Karan agrees, though unwillingly, and tries to convince her to give up on her plans.
Soon, Swati discovers that she has been manipulated by the man she trusted the most. A conflict of ideas is set to engulf their five-year-old marriage. Swati remains adamant about fighting for the rights of villagers.
Narayani Shastri has really long and luscious hair in this show.

Cast 
 Narayani Shastri as Swati Karan Sehgal
 Sachin Tyagi as Karan Sehgal
 Shishir Sharma as Indrajeet Sehgal (Karan's Father)
 Kishwer Merchant as Priya Sehgal (Karan's Sister)
 Prithvi Zutshi as Swati's Father
 Smita Hai as Swati's Mother
 Gayatri Sehgal as Karan's Mother 
 Aman Verma as Rohit Malhotra
 Bikramjeet Kanwarpal as Mr. Khurana

Real (TV channel) original programming
2009 Indian television series debuts
2010 Indian television series endings
Indian television soap operas